Gunnar Grönblom (15 March 1895 – 7 August 1939) was a Finnish sailor. He competed in the 8 Metre event at the 1936 Summer Olympics.

References

External links
 

1895 births
1939 deaths
Finnish male sailors (sport)
Olympic sailors of Finland
Sailors at the 1936 Summer Olympics – 8 Metre
Sportspeople from Turku